The men's 10,000 metres at the 2003 All-Africa Games were held on October 12.

Results

References
Results
Results

10000